The 2022 Vuelta a Burgos was a men's road cycling stage race that took place from 2 to 6 August 2022 in the Spanish province of Burgos. It was the 44th edition of the Vuelta a Burgos, and was rated as a 2.Pro event as part of the 2022 UCI ProSeries calendar.

Teams 
Twelve of the eighteen UCI WorldTeams were joined by five UCI ProTeams to make up the seventeen teams that participated in the race.

UCI WorldTeams

 
 
 
 
 
 
 
 
 
 
 
 

UCI ProTeams

Route

Stages

Stage 1 
2 August 2022 – Burgos (Catedral) to Burgos (El Castillo),

Stage 2 
3 August 2022 – Vivar del Cid to Villadiego,

Stage 3 
4 August 2022 –  to Villarcayo,

Stage 4 
5 August 2022 – Torresandino to Clunia,

Stage 5 

Classification leadership table

Final classification standings

General classification

Points classification

Mountains classification

Young rider classification

Spanish rider classification

Team classification

References

External links 

2022
Vuelta a Burgos
Vuelta a Burgos
Vuelta a Burgos